Master of the Legend of Saint Lucy (fl. 1480–1510) was an unidentified Early Netherlandish painter from Bruges. His name comes from an altarpiece in the church of Saint James in Bruges, dated 1480, depicting three scenes from the life of Saint Lucy. Since then, twenty-five to thirty-five paintings have been attributed to the same hand. He may have trained Spanish students at his studio in Bruges. Many of his paintings are characterized by views of the city of Bruges in the background, and can be dated according to the level of construction of its belfry. He may have trained with Dieric Bouts, and was certainly influenced by Hans Memling.

He has been associated with the Bruges master Fransois vanden Pitte, active in Bruges between 1453 and 1456.

Bibliography
D. de Vos, "Nieuwe toeschrijvingen aan de Meester van de Lucialegende, alias de Meester van de Rotterdamse Johannes op Patmos", Oud Holland, XC, 1976, .
Max Jakob Friedländer, Early Netherlandish Painting, VI, Hans Memling and Gerard David, New York, 1972.
D. Martens, "Der Brügger Meister der Lucialegende. Bilanz der Forschungen und neue Hypothesen", Die Kunstbeziehungen Estlands mit den Niederlanden in den 15.-17. Jahrhunderten. Der Marienaltar des Meisters der Lucialegende 500 Jahre in Tallinn, Konferenz 25–26 September 1995, Tallinn, 2000, .
A. M. Roberts, The Master of the Legend of Saint Lucy: a catalogue and critical essay [Dissertation], University of Pennsylvania, 1982.
N. Veronee-Verhaegen, "Le Maître de la Légende de sainte Lucie: précisions sur son œuvre", in Bulletin de l'Institut royal du Patrimoine artistique, II, 1959, .
S. Zdanov, "Quelle identité pour le Maître de la Légende de sainte Lucie? Révision des hypothèses et proposition d'identification", in Koregos. Revue et encyclopédie multimédia des arts sous l'égide de l'Académie royale de Belgique, 2013, 76. 
Mänd, Anu. The Altarpiece of the Virgin Mary and the Confraternity of the Black Heads. - Acta Historiae Artium Balticae, 2 (2007) pp. 35-53

References

External links

Master of the Saint Lucy Legend at Artcyclopedia
Master of the Saint Lucy Legend

Early Netherlandish painters
Legend of Saint Lucy, Master of the
Artists from Bruges